This is a list of seasons completed by the St. Bonaventure Bonnies football team, also known at times at the Brown Indians and the Brown and White, formerly of the National Collegiate Athletic Association (NCAA). St. Bonaventure's first football team was fielded in 1895.

St. Bonaventure originally competed as a football independent, before competing for years as a member of the Western New York Little Three Conference with local Catholic rivals Canisius and Niagara. Football participation in the Little Three declined in the years following World War II, and, by the early 1950s, all three schools had discontinued their football programs.

Seasons

References

St. Bonaventure

St. Bonaventure Bonnies football seasons